Peter Souter (born 1962) is the chairman and chief creative officer of TBWA London and former executive creative director of Abbott Mead Vickers BBDO.

Souter is also a writer, and has written plays for theatre and radio, including the screenplay for the ITV television drama Married Single Other.

Advertising career
Souter began his career in advertising as a copywriter at Abbott Mead Vickers BBDO in 1991, where he worked alongside Paul Brazier for 4 years. He then moved on to become deputy creative director in 1995, then executive creative director in 1997, taking over for David Abbott. In 2005 he worked on the 'Make Poverty History' campaign, which he said was the work of which he is most proud.

Writing career
Souter has written plays for radio, theatre and television. His radio plays for BBC Radio 4 include Puddle, Goldfish Girl, Stream River Sea, That's Mine, This is Yours, What Love Sounds like, and "13a, 13b".

Souter's television drama, Married Single Other, is a series based on the lives of group of people who are either married, single or "other", other being defined as in a relationship. It was aired on ITV in February 2010.

For theatre, Souter wrote the play Hello/Goodbye, which was sold out at the Hampstead Theatre in its first run in 2013, and is playing again from 21 January to 28 February 2015.

References

British advertising executives
1962 births
Living people
English dramatists and playwrights